Ves Touškov is a municipality and village in Plzeň-South District in the Plzeň Region of the Czech Republic. It has about 300 inhabitants.

Administrative parts
The village of Mířovice is an administrative part of Ves Touškov.

History
The first written mention of Ves Touškov is from 1243.

References

Villages in Plzeň-South District